Bruce Parkhouse Barnes (November 24, 1909 – March 12, 1990) was a high-ranking professional American tennis player of the 1930s.

Biography
Barnes was born in Dallas, Texas. As a professional, he won the 1933 world men's doubles championship with Bill Tilden, and lost the finals of the 1937 United States Professional Championship to Karel Koželuh and the 1938 finals to Fred Perry.  In 1943, with the ranks of players severely depleted by World War II, he won the championship by beating John Nogrady.

He was ranked World No. 7 in Ray Bowers' pro rankings for both 1938 and 1942 (and in the amateur-pro combined rankings for the latter).

Barnes attended Austin High School.  As a collegiate player at the University of Texas, Austin he won the NCAA doubles championship in 1931 partnering Karl Kamrath.  He lost the singles final to Keith Gledhill of Stanford in four sets. He was a member of Delta Tau Delta International Fraternity.

Barnes was the coach of the United States Davis Cup team in 1939.

Pro Slam tournaments

Singles: (1 title, 2 runner-ups)

References

External links
Texas Longhorns sports hall of fame inductee page

American male tennis players
American tennis coaches
Tennis players from Dallas
Tennis people from Texas
Texas Longhorns men's tennis players
1909 births
1990 deaths
Professional tennis players before the Open Era